Martin Polaček (born 2 April 1990) is a Slovak professional footballer who plays as a goalkeeper for Slovak side Liptovský Mikuláš .

International career
On 10 November 2017, Polaček made his international debut for Slovakia in the 46th minute of a friendly match against Ukraine, substituting Martin Dúbravka.

References

External links
 Profile at LevskiSofia.info

Eurofotbal profile

1990 births
Living people
Slovak footballers
Slovakia international footballers
Association football goalkeepers
FC Zbrojovka Brno players
FK Spišská Nová Ves players
FK Bodva Moldava nad Bodvou players
FC DAC 1904 Dunajská Streda players
ŠK Slovan Bratislava players
Zagłębie Lubin players
FK Mladá Boleslav players
PFC Levski Sofia players
Podbeskidzie Bielsko-Biała players
MFK Tatran Liptovský Mikuláš players
Ekstraklasa players
Slovak Super Liga players
2. Liga (Slovakia) players
I liga players
Czech First League players
Sportspeople from Prešov
Slovak expatriate footballers
Expatriate footballers in Poland
Expatriate footballers in Bulgaria
Expatriate footballers in the Czech Republic
Slovak expatriate sportspeople in Poland
Slovak expatriate sportspeople in Bulgaria
Slovak expatriate sportspeople in the Czech Republic